Come Over may refer to:

 "Come Over" (Faith Evans song), 1996
 "Come Over" (Aaliyah song), 2003
 "Come Over" (Estelle song), 2008
 "Come Over" (Kenny Chesney song), 2012
 "Come Over" (Clean Bandit song), 2014
 "Come Over", 2018 song by the Internet from Hive Mind
 "Do You Wanna Come Over?", 2016 song by Britney Spears
 Come Over (Rudimental song) 2020

See also
 Come On Over (disambiguation)